As of 2015, Tirukkural has been translated into Punjabi at least twice.

Background
In 1983, the Kural text was translated into Punjabi by Ram Murthy Sharma. Titled Tirukkural: Dharma Granth of Tamils, this was published in Chandigarh. Another translated was made by Tarlochan Singh Bedi, former principal of the government college of Faridkot, in 2012, which was published by the Central Institute of Classical Tamil (CICT), Chennai, and released in November 2013. The translation was part of CICT's project of translating the Kural into multiple languages including Telugu, Kannada, Nepali, Manipuri and other Indian languages.

Translations

See also
 Tirukkural translations
 List of Tirukkural translations by language

Published translations
 Tarlochan Singh Bedi. (2012). Tirukkural in Punjabi, Central Institute of Classical Tamil. 296 pages.

References 

Punjabi
Translations into Punjabi